Mahirud (also Romanized as Māhīrūd, Mahi Rood; also known as Mahrūd and Māhrūd) is a village in Doreh Rural District, in the Central District of Sarbisheh County, South Khorasan Province, Iran. At the 2006 census, its population was 331, in 108 families. Mahirud borders the Farah Province of Afghanistan.

References 

Populated places in Sarbisheh County